A number of ships have been named SS Sarpedon after Sarpedon, king of the Lycians during the Trojan War:

 , a 1,949-ton ship of the Blue Funnel Line
 , a 2,036-ton ship of the Blue Funnel Line
 , a 4,663-ton ship of the Blue Funnel Line
 , an 11,321-ton ship of the Blue Funnel Line
 , a 7,797-ton ship of the Blue Funnel Line, originally named 
 , an 8,983-ton ship of the Blue Funnel Line from 1967 to scrapping in 1969, formerly Glen Line's .

See also
 Sarpedon (disambiguation)
 

Ship names